ePages is an e-commerce solution that allows merchants to create and run online shops in the cloud. The number of shops based on ePages is currently 140,000 worldwide.
ePages software is regularly updated due to its Software-as-a-Service model.  An investor in the company is United Internet, with a 25% stake. ePages focuses upon distributing its products mainly through hosting providers, such as 1&1 Internet, Strato AG or Webfusion's brands Host Europe and 123-reg. Additional sales partners include logistics, telecoms, and yellow pages companies. The company collaborates with 80+ technology partners including online marketplaces, payment and logistics companies, and ERP vendors. ePages is headquartered in Hamburg, with additional offices in London, Barcelona, New York City and Jena.

History
The name ePages was used for the first time for software in 1997 to market "Intershop ePages". In 2002, the product line then called Intershop 4 was taken over by ePages GmbH and renamed to ePages.

Features
Depending on the ePages product (Base, Flex, Enterprise, Multistore) and packages offered by hosting providers, merchants can sell up to an unlimited number of items. Users can offer their products and services in 15 languages and with all currencies. With ePages, merchants can use web marketing tools; e.g. newsletters, coupons or social media plug-ins for social commerce.
ePages has developed and optimised the shop content's display on mobile devices  and added a filter search feature. Further to this, major online market places such as eBay and Amazon, search engines like Google, payment providers such as PayPal and  Enterprise resource planning systems such as SAP Business One and Sage Office Line 24 are integrated into the software.

See also
 Comparison of shopping cart software

References

Web applications
Software companies of Germany
Companies based in Hamburg